Alija is both a surname and a given name. Notable people with the name include:

Surname 
Ifraim Alija (born 1985), footballer
Kučuk Alija (died 1804), janissary, mutesellim of Kragujevac and one of four Dahiyas who controlled Belgrade Pashaluk

Given name – female 
Alija Jussupowa (born 1984), rhythmic gymnast of Kazakh ethnicity who competes for Kazakhstan

Bosnian Given name – male 
Alija Alijagić (1896-1922), Bosnian communist and assassin
Alija Behmen (1940–2018), former mayor of Sarajevo and a member of the Social Democratic Party of Bosnia and Herzegovina
Alija Bešić (born 1975), retired Luxembourgian professional football player of Bosnian descent
Alija Đerđelez, popular legendary hero of poetry and literature in Bosnia and Albania
Alija Dumas (born 1929), former Democratic member of the Pennsylvania House of Representatives
Alija Gušanac (fl. 1804–05), Albanian Ottoman brigand
Alija Isaković (1932–1997), Bosnian writer, publicist and lexicographer of Bosnian
Alija Izetbegović (1925–2003), the first President of Bosnia and Herzegovina
Alija Krnić (born 1993), Montenegrin footballer
Alija Sirotanović (1914–1990), Yugoslav miner of Bosniak ethnicity, Hero of Socialist Labour
Alija Solak (born 1944), Bosnian footballer
Alija Šuljak (1901-1992), Bosnian Muslim Croat politician and Ustaše military officer

Fictional characters 
Alija Eaglespike of Warrior, a fantasy novel written by Australian author Jennifer Fallon

See also
Alija del Infantado, a municipality which is part of Tierra de La Bañeza comarca, an autonomous community of Castile and León, Spain
Alia (name)
Aliya
Alijan (disambiguation)
Alinja
Avlija
Balija
Galija
Malija
Salija

Bosnian masculine given names
Albanian masculine given names
Bosniak masculine given names
Albanian-language surnames